There were thirteen boxing events at the 2018 South American Games in Cochabamba, Bolivia. Ten for men and three for women. The events were held between June 1 and 6 at the Coliseo Suramericano.

Medal summary

Medal table

Men's events

Results

Light flyweight

Flyweight

Bantamweight

Lightweight

Light welterweight

Welterweight

Middleweight

Light heavyweight

Heavyweight

Super Heavyweight

Women's events

Flyweight

Lightweight

Middleweight

References

2018 South American Games events
South American Games
2018